Prats de Lluçanès ((Officially and in Catalan,) is a municipality in the comarca of Osona in Catalonia, Spain. It is situated in the west of the comarca, on a plain between the Lluçanès and Merlès rivers, and is served by the C-154 road between Vic and Gironella.

In 2015, the municipality voted to join a proposed new comarca of Lluçanès, of which it would be the capital, but the plan was put on hold due to insufficient support.

Demography

References

 Panareda Clopés, Josep Maria; Rios Calvet, Jaume; Rabella Vives, Josep Maria (1989). Guia de Catalunya, Barcelona: Caixa de Catalunya.  (Spanish).  (Catalan).

External links 
Official website 
 Government data pages 

Municipalities in Osona